Monarca was a 68-gun ship of the line of the Spanish Navy, ordered in 1754 to a design by expatriate British ship designer Richard Rooth and launched in 1756. She belonged to the four-ship Triunfante class.

She fought at the Battle of Cape St Vincent in 1780, in which she was captured by the Royal Navy and subsequently commissioned as the third rate HMS Monarca. She came under the command of Captain John Gell who was under the orders of Sir Samuel Hood to go to the West Indies. However, she was dismasted in a storm and obliged to return to Britain for refitting.

She fought at the Battle of Cuddalore in 1783 and was sold out of the navy in 1791.

Notes

References

 Lavery, Brian (2003) The Ship of the Line – Volume 1: The development of the battlefleet 1650–1850. Conway Maritime Press. .

External links
 

Ships of the line of the Spanish Navy
Ships of the line of the Royal Navy
1756 ships